Großes Heiliges Meer is a lake in Hopsten, Kreis Steinfurt, North Rhine-Westphalia, Germany. At an elevation of 42,5 m, its surface area is 11 ha.

Lakes of North Rhine-Westphalia